Events from the year 1144 in Ireland.

Incumbents
High King: Toirdelbach Ua Conchobair

Events

Deaths
Conchobar Ua Conchobair